Ron Protas is the former Associate Director of the Martha Graham Center of Contemporary Dance and heir of modern dance choreographer Martha Graham.

Agnes de Mille writes in Martha: The Life and Work of Martha Graham that in the late 1960s Protas, who had been a law student at Columbia University, became introduced to the Martha Graham Dance Company. De Mille writes that Protas was not well liked by company members, as he was not a dancer and had no reason to be involved with the company. Initially, Graham did not like Protas. But when Graham's health began to fail, as a result of her alcoholism and depression over having to retire from her performing career, Protas stepped in and nursed Graham back to health. De Mille writes that over the next several years the influence of Protas grew, eventually he and Graham restructured the company entirely. According to de Mille, Protas soon embarked on a campaign to copyright the Martha Graham Dance Technique: "Now, under the guidance of Ron Protas, there was an attempt to charge royalties for all usage, not only of composed dances, but of actual technique: an impossible objective." Eventually, Protas became the second most powerful person in the Martha Graham Center of Contemporary Dance, second only to the founder herself.

In her autobiography Blood Memory Martha Graham writes that she trained Protas in her dance technique and that he will be her heir upon her death.

Shortly after the death of Martha Graham, Mr. Protas sued the Martha Graham Dance Company, forbidding them from performing Martha Graham's choreography. Only after a lengthy and multimillion-dollar legal battle were the rights to the choreographic works restored the Martha Graham Dance Company.

See also

 Martha Graham Center of Contemporary Dance

Notes

External links
 Village Voice: "Maelstrom at Martha's"
 Ballet Magazine: "Who Owns Martha Graham's Work?"
 New York Times archive of Ron Protas articles

Modern dance
Martha Graham
Living people
American arts administrators
Year of birth missing (living people)